The 2015 season was FH's 31st season in Úrvalsdeild and their 15th consecutive season in top-flight of Icelandic Football.

Along with the Úrvalsdeild, the club competed in the Lengjubikarinn, the Borgunarbikarinn and the 2015–16 UEFA Europa League were they entered in the first qualifying round.

Heimir Guðjónsson head coached the team for the 8th consecutive season after having signed a new 2-year contract on 14 October 2014.

On 26 September FH were crowned champions after a 2–1 win over Fjölnir with one game to spare. This was FH's 7th league title.

First team

Current squad

Transfers and loans

Transfers in

Transfers out

Loans out

Preseason

Fótbolti.net Cup
FH took part in the 2015 Fótbolti.net Cup, a pre-season tournament for clubs outside of Reykjavík. The team played in Group 1 along with ÍA, Breiðablik and Þróttur R. FH finished second in the group with 6 points, 2 wins and 1 defeat.

FH played Keflavík in the 3rd place final and lost on penalties after the game had ended 1–1.

Lengjubikarinn
FH came into the 2015 Lengjubikarinn as defending champions. They were drawn in Group 1 along with Breiðablik, Fylkir, ÍBV, Þróttur R, Víkingur Ó, BÍ/Bolungarvík and HK. FH won 4 and lost 2 of their first 6 games in the group. In the seventh round FH defeated Þróttur R 3–2 and booked their place in the quarter-finals as the third placed team with the best results. Kristján Flóki scored his first goal for the team in the game.

On 16 April FH were eliminated by Víkingur R after a penalty shootout 4–1. The game had finished 1–1 with Kassim Doumbia scoring FH's only goal.

Úrvalsdeild

League table

Matches

Summary of results

Points breakdown
 Points at home: 26
 Points away from home: 22
 6 Points: Keflavík, ÍA, Leiknir R, Víkingur R, ÍBV, Fjölnir
 4 Points: Stjarnan
 3 Points: KR, Valur
 2 Points:
 1 Point: Breiðablik, Fylkir
 0 Points:

Borgunarbikarinn
FH came into the Icelandic cup, Borgunarbikarinn, in the 32nd-finals and were drawn against HK. FH won the game 2–1 with all the goals coming in the first half. In the 16th finals FH was drawn against Grindavík. FH won the game 2–1 with 2 goals from Steven Lennon, both coming from the penalty spot. In the quarter finals FH was drawn against KR. FH lost the game 2–1.

Europa League
FH came into the 2015–16 UEFA Europa League in the 1st qualifying round.

On 22 June FH was drawn against the Finnish team SJK Seinäjoki. FH won the first leg, away from home, 1–0. Steven Lennon scored the only goal. In the second leg FH also won 1–0 winning the tie 2–0 on aggregate. Kristján Flóki scored the winning goal on the 91st minute.

In the second qualifying round FH was drawn against Inter Baku PIK from Azerbaijan. In the first leg FH lost 2–1, they started the game well and went ahead on the 39th minute courtesy of a penalty goal from Atli Guðnason, this was Atli's 11th goal in a European competition making him the highest scoring player for an Icelandic team in European competitions. In the second half Róbert Örn got sent off and Inter Baku PIK equalised from the penalty spot, Kristján Finnbogason came on in goal at the age of 44 years. FH couldn't hang on to a draw and Inter Baku PIK scored the winning goal on the 61st minute. In the second leg FH managed to equalise the tie 3–3 with goals from Þórarinn Ingi and Kristján Flóki but lost the game in extra time. As in the first leg FH got a man sent off when Kristján Flóki wrongly got his second yellow card on the 56th minute.

First qualifying round

Second qualifying round

Statistics

Goalscorers
Includes all competitive matches.

Appearances
Includes all competitive matches. Numbers in parentheses are sub-appearances.

Disciplinary record
Includes all competitive matches.

Squad stats
Includes all competitive matches; Úrvalsdeild, Borgunarbikar, Lengjubikar and UEFA Europa League.
{| class="wikitable" style="text-align:center;"
|-
!  style="background:#ffffff; color:black; width:150px;"|
!  style="background:#ffffff; color:black; width:75px;"|Úrvalsdeild
!  style="background:#ffffff; color:black; width:75px;"|Borgunarbikar
!  style="background:#ffffff; color:black; width:75px;"|Lengjubikar
!  style="background:#ffffff; color:black; width:75px;"|Europe
!  style="background:#ffffff; color:black; width:75px;"|Total
|-
|align=left|Games played       || 22 || 3 || 8 || 4 || 37
|-
|align=left|Games won          || 15 || 2 || 5 || 2 || 24
|-
|align=left|Games drawn        || 3 || 0 || 1 || 1 || 5
|-
|align=left|Games lost         || 4 || 1 || 2 || 1 || 8
|-
|align=left|Goals scored       || 47 || 5 || 14 || 5 || 71
|-
|align=left|Goals conceded     || 26 || 4 || 9 || 4 || 43
|-
|align=left|Clean sheets       || 5 || 0 || 3 || 2 || 10
|-
|align=left|Yellow cards       || 52 || 5 || 18 || 13 || 88
|-
|align=left|Red cards         || 1 || 0 || 2 || 2 || 5
|-

References

External links
 Fimleikafélag Hafnarfjarðar Official Site
 FHingar – Fimleikafélag Hafnarfjarðar Fan Site

FH